Domenico Scilipoti Isgrò (born 26 August 1957 in Barcellona Pozzo di Gotto, Sicily) is an Italian politician and doctor.

Biography
Domenico Scilipoti graduated from the University of Messina in medicine and surgery, getting a specialization in gynecology and obstetrics. He practices as a gynecologist and acupuncturist and was a visiting professor at the Departamento de Anatomia Humana at the Federal University of Paraná (State of Brazil) and the A.B.P.S. of Salvador de Bahia (Brazil).

Scilipoti was municipal councilor in Terme Vigliatore (Messina) from 1983 to 1998 and from 2003 to 2005; for the same municipality he also served as deputy mayor in 1986 and as assessor of budget and finance in 1998.

In the 2001 and 2006 general election he was candidate for the Senate with the Italy of Values, but he was not elected. He was elected for the first time at the Chamber of Deputies in the 2008 general election.

On 9 December 2010 he left IdV to found the Movement of National Responsibility and on 14 December, along with Bruno Cesario and Massimo Calearo, saved the Berlusconi IV Cabinet voting for the trust. Shortly after the vote of trust in the Chambers, in Piazza San Silvestro in Rome, some immigrants paraded in front of TV newscasts with banners supporting the decisions of Scilipoti. Identified by the police, they declared that they were paid by the same deputy to make believe that there is a consensus on his choices.

In January 2011 he joined the new parliamentary group Responsible Initiative (later People and Territory), of which he was elected vicar deputy leader.

In the 2013 general election Scilipoti was elected senator with The People of Freedom. He was again candidate to the Senate in 2018 with Forza Italia, but he was not re-elected.

Publications

References

External links
Official website

1957 births
Living people
Italian Democratic Socialist Party politicians
Italy of Values politicians
The People of Freedom politicians
Forza Italia (2013) politicians
Deputies of Legislature XVI of Italy
Senators of Legislature XVII of Italy
Politicians of Sicily
Italian gynaecologists
Italian expatriates in Brazil
20th-century Italian physicians
Acupuncturists